Phil Sykes (born March 18, 1959) is a former college and professional ice hockey player.  He played college hockey for the University of North Dakota Fighting Sioux helping them win NCAA national championships in 1980 and 1982. He was named to the NCAA Championship all-tournament team in both 1980 and 1982 and the WCHA first all-star team in 1982. He was also named the NCAA's championship tournament MVP in 1982.

His National Hockey League playing career began with the Los Angeles Kings in the 1982–1983 season. He finished his career playing for the Winnipeg Jets following the 1991–1992 season. He played 456 games in the NHL and 212 games in the AHL during his 10-year professional career.

Career statistics

Regular season and playoffs

International

Awards and honours

References

External links 
 

1959 births
Living people
Canadian ice hockey left wingers
Ice hockey people from British Columbia
Los Angeles Kings players
Moncton Hawks players
NCAA men's ice hockey national champions
New Haven Nighthawks players
North Dakota Fighting Hawks men's ice hockey players
People from Dawson Creek
Spruce Grove Mets players
Undrafted National Hockey League players
Winnipeg Jets (1979–1996) players